Delphine Lansac (born 18 July 1995) is a French badminton player. She participated in the 2015 BWF World Championships in women's singles and women's doubles (with Émilie Lefel). In 2016, she competed at the Summer Olympic Games held in Rio de Janeiro, Brazil. In the group stage, she was defeated by Liang Xiaoyu 21-7-21-15, and by Sung Ji-hyun 21-13, 21-14.

Achievements

European Junior Championships 
Girls' singles

BWF International Challenge/Series 
Women's singles

Women's doubles

  BWF International Challenge tournament
  BWF International Series tournament
  BWF Future Series tournament

References

External links 
 
 
 
 
 

1995 births
Living people
Sportspeople from Lyon
French female badminton players
Badminton players at the 2016 Summer Olympics
Olympic badminton players of France
Badminton players at the 2015 European Games
European Games competitors for France
21st-century French women